Yevhen Viktorovych Radionov (born 6 March 1990) is a Ukrainian professional footballer who plays as a forward for Świt Nowy Dwór Mazowiecki.

Career

As a youth player, Radionov trialed for the youth academy of Ukrainian top flight side Dnipro.

Before the second half of 2010–11, he signed for Kryształ Glinojeck in the Polish fourth division from Ukrainian third division club Kremin.

Before the second half of 2012–13, Radionov signed for GKS Katowice in the Polish second division from Polish fourth division team Ursus Warszawa, where he made 15 league appearances and scored no goals.

In 2016, he signed for ŁKS Łódź in the Polish third division, helping them achieve promotion to the top flight within two seasons.

Before the second half of 2019–20, Radionov signed for Polish second division outfit Puszcza Niepołomice.

References

External links
 
 
 

Ukrainian footballers
1990 births
Association football forwards
Living people
FC Illichivets-2 Mariupol players
ŁKS Łódź players
GKS Katowice players
Świt Nowy Dwór Mazowiecki players
FC Stal Kamianske players
FC Kremin Kremenchuk players
Puszcza Niepołomice players
GKS Bełchatów players
Ukrainian Second League players
Ekstraklasa players
I liga players
II liga players
III liga players
Ukrainian expatriate footballers
Expatriate footballers in Poland
Ukrainian expatriate sportspeople in Poland